The 1917 Santa Clara rugby team was a college rugby team that represented Santa Clara University as an independent during the 1917 college football season. The team compiled a 9–1 record, shut out eight of ten opponents, and outscored all opponents by a total of 334 to 18.

Charley Austin resigned as the team's head coach after the first game. He was replaced by Walter Von Mandersheid.

During the 1910s, many California colleges replaced their American football programs with rugby. Santa Clara includes these teams as part of its college football history.

Schedule

References

Santa Clara
Santa Clara Broncos football seasons
Santa Clara Missionites football